Christian Barrientos (born February 6, 1984) is a Mexican former football goalkeeper who last played for Celaya in the Ascenso MX.

External links
Ascenso MX 

1984 births
Living people
Place of birth missing (living people)
Association football goalkeepers
Mexican footballers
Club Celaya footballers
Liga MX players